The Women's 400m race for class T38 athletes with cerebral palsy at the 2004 Summer Paralympics were held in the Athens Olympic Stadium on 27 September. The event consisted of a single race, and was won by Katrina Webb, representing .

Final round

27 Sept. 2004, 19:00

References

W
2004 in women's athletics